María del Pilar Cuesta Acosta (born 27 May 1951, Madrid), known professionally as Ana Belén, is a Spanish actress and singer.

Life/career
Born in 1951, Ana Belén is the oldest of three children. Her father was a cook in Hotel Palace, and her mother worked as doorwoman at an estate. Ana Belén studied acting in Spain during her youth and began acting in theatrical and cinematic productions in the mid-1960.

While working on the film Morbo by Gonzalo Suárez, she met Víctor Manuel, marrying him in 1972 in Gibraltar. At this time she also started her career as a singer, releasing several successful albums. She appeared in various films: La petición by Pilar Miró; Emilia parada y fonda by Angelino Fons; El buscón by Luciano Berriatúa; La oscura historia de la prima Montse by Jordi Cadena; La criatura by Eloy de la Iglesia, and Sonámbulos by Manuel Gutiérrez Aragón. 

In 1986, Ana Belén, alongside songwriter Víctor Manuel, performed the song "La Puerta de Alcalá". The single remained at the top position in Spain for seven weeks in summer 1986. In 1991, she recorded Como una novia, her first album that did not include any songs composed or adapted by Víctor Manuel. In 1997, she released a new album, Mírame, of her own songs and duets and which went on to become the best-selling album of her solo career. In autumn of 1996, she – along with Joan Manuel Serrat, Miguel Ríos, and Víctor Manuel – set ticket sales records throughout Spain with their "El gusto es nuestro" tour. In 1998, Belen commemorated Federico García Lorca's centenary by releasing two albums under the title of Lorquiana, a collection of poems and popular songs by Lorca. The following year another album was released Ana Belén y Miguel Ríos cantan a Kurt Weill, and she had a role in the Tele 5 series, Petra Delicado.

Discography
 1965
 Zampo y yo
 Qué difícil es tener 18 años
 1973
 Al diablo con amor (BSO)
 Tierra
 1975
 Calle del Oso
 1976
 La paloma del vuelo popular
 1977
 De paso
 1979
 Ana
 Lo mejor de Ana Belén
 1980
 Con las manos llenas
 1982
 Ana en Río
 1983
 Victor y Ana en vivo
 1984
 Géminis
 1985
 BSO La corte de faraón
 1986
 Para la ternura siempre hay tiempo (with Víctor Manuel)
 Grandes éxitos
 1987
 BSO Divinas palabras
 1988
 A la sombra de un león
 1989
    26 grandes canciones y una nube blanca
   Rosa de amor y fuego
 1991
 Como una novia
 1993
 Veneno para el corazón
    1994
   Mucho más que dos
    1996
   20 exitos
     El gusto es nuestro
 1997
 Mírame
 1998
 Lorquiana. Popular songs of Federico García Lorca
 Lorquiana. Poems by Federico García Lorca
 1999
 Cantan a Kurt Weill (with Miguel Ríos)
 2001
 Peces de ciudad
 Dos en la carretera
 2003
 Viva L`Italia
 2006
 Una canción me trajo aquí
 2007
 Anatomía
 2008
 Los grandes éxitos... y mucho más
 2011
 A los hombres que amé
 2015
 Canciones regaladas (with Víctor Manuel)
 2018
 Vida
 2021
 Ana Belén 70

Filmography

Film

Television

Stage 
Romeo y Julieta (2023)
Antonio y Cleopatra (2021)
Eva contra Eva (2021/2022)
Medea (2015/2016).
Kathie y el hipopótamo (2013/2015)
Electra (2012)
Fedra (2007, 2009/2010)
Diatriba de amor contra un hombre sentado (2004/2005)
Defensa de dama (2002)
La bella Helena (1995/1996)
La gallarda (1992)
El mercader de Venecia (1991/1992)
Hamlet (1989)
La casa de Bernarda Alba (1984)
La hija del aire (1982)
Tío Vania (1979)
Antígona (1975)
Ravos (1972)
Sabor a miel (1971)
Los niños (1970)
Te espero ayer (1969)
Don Juan Tenorio (1969)
Medida por medida (1968)
Las mujeres sabias (1968)
El sí de las niñas (1967)
El rufián castrucho (1967)
El rey Lear (1966)
Numancia (1965)

Awards 

 1971 Best TV actress for Retablo de las mocedades del Cid Fotogramas Award
 1972 Special mention for Morbo San Sebastián International Film Festival
 1980 Best TV actress for Fortunata y Jacinta Fotogramas de Plata
 1980 Best actress for Fortunata y Jacinta TP de Oro
 1980 Best actress for La Corte del Faraón Bronce
 1980 Chevalier des Arts et des Lettres
 1987 Best actress for La Casa de Bernarda Alba and Divinas palabras Fotogramas de Plata
 1988 Nominated for Best actress for Miss Caribe Goya Awards
 1989 Nominated for Best actress for El vuelo de la Paloma Goya Awards
 1991 Nominated for Best director for Como ser mujer y no morir en el intento Premios Ondas
 1991 Nominated for Best director debut for Como ser mujer y no morir en el intento Goya Awards
 1994 Best song for Contaminame Premios Ondas
 1994 Nominated for Best actress for La Pasión Turca Goya Awards
 1994 Best Actress for La Pasión Turca Goya Awards
 1995 Gold Medal from the Spanish Cinema Academy
 1995 Best theatre actress for La bella Helena Fotogramas de Plata
 1996 Cadena Dial Award
 1997 Best Female soloist. Carlos Gardel Awards
 1997 Best actress El amor perjudica seriamente la salud Festival de Peñíscola
 1997 Silver Lighthouse Award. Festival de Alfás del Pí
 1997 Best Tour El gusto es nuestro Spanish Music Awards
 1998 Nominated for Best Spanish female soloist for Lorquiana Premios Amigo
 2000 William Layton Award
 2001 Woman of the Year. Premios Elle
 2001 Nominated Best Spanish female soloist for Peces de ciudad Premios Amigo
 2002 Nominated Best female soloist for Peces de ciudad Latin Grammy Awards
 2002 Runner up Defensa de dama Premios Mayte of Theatre
 2003 Homage by the Instituto Cervantes of Toulouse
 2004 Nominated for Best actress Cosas que hacen que la vida valga la pena Goya Awards
 2004 Nominated for Best actress Cosas que hacen que la vida valga la pena Fotogramas de Plata
 2004 Nominated for Best actress Cosas que hacen que la vida valga la pena Spanish Actors' Union
 2004 Best actress Cosas que hacen que la vida valga la pena Premios Turia
 2006 Málaga Award. Film Festival of Málaga
 2007 Fine Arts Golden Medal presented by the Spanish royal family at Toledo Cathedral
 2015 Latin Grammy Awards for Musical Excellence.
 2017 Honorary Goya Award.

References

External links

  portalatino.com
 

1951 births
Living people
Actresses from Madrid
Singers from Madrid
Spanish film actresses
Spanish women singers
Spanish stage actresses
Spanish television actresses
Sony Music Spain artists
Latin Grammy Lifetime Achievement Award winners
20th-century Spanish actresses
21st-century Spanish actresses
Women in Latin music